Westhoughton was a parliamentary constituency in Lancashire, England. Centred on the former mining and cotton town of Westhoughton, it returned one Member of Parliament (MP) to the House of Commons of the Parliament of the United Kingdom.

The constituency was created for the 1885 general election, and abolished for the 1983 general election.

History and boundaries

1885–1918
The Redistribution of Seats Act 1885 divided the existing constituency of South East Lancashire into eight single-member seats. The new seat of South-East Lancashire, Westhoughton Division comprised an area surrounding, but not including, the County Borough of Bolton. It consisted of the towns of Aspull, Blackrod, Horwich, Little Lever, and Westhoughton, and the surrounding townships of Anglezarke, Bradshaw, Breightmet, Darcy Lever, Edgworth, Entwistle, Great Lever, Harwood, Heaton, Longworth, Lostock, Middle Hulton, Over Hulton, Quarlton and Rivington, plus Turton Urban District, and the parts of Rumworth, Sharples and Tonge with Haulgh outside the Parliamentary Borough of Bolton.

1918–1950
The Representation of the People Act 1918 reorganised parliamentary seats throughout Great Britain and Ireland. Constituencies were redefined in terms of the urban and rural districts created by the Local Government Act 1894. Lancashire, Westhoughton Division consisted of five adjoining urban districts: Aspull, Blackrod, Hindley, Horwich and Westhoughton.

1950–1983
The next redrawing of English constituencies was effected by the Representation of the People Act 1948. The Act introduced the term "county constituency". Westhoughton County Constituency was enlarged by the addition of Standish with Langtree Urban District and Wigan Rural District. The revised boundaries were first used at the 1950 general election, and were unchanged until abolition.

Abolition
The 1983 redistribution of seats reflected local government reforms made in 1974. The bulk of the seat became part of the parliamentary county of Greater Manchester: Blackrod, Horwich and Westhoughton formed part of the new Bolton West county constituency, Aspull and Standish part of Wigan borough constituency and Hindley was included in Leigh borough constituency. Some parishes in the north of the old constituency remained in Lancashire, and were included in Chorley county constituency.

Members of Parliament

Election results

Elections in the 1880s

Elections in the 1890s

Elections in the 1900s

Elections in the 1910s

Elections in the 1920s

 Endorsed by the Coalition Government

Elections in the 1930s

Elections in the 1940s

Elections in the 1950s

Elections in the 1960s

Elections in the 1970s

References 

Parliamentary constituencies in North West England (historic)
Politics of the Metropolitan Borough of Bolton
Constituencies of the Parliament of the United Kingdom established in 1885
Constituencies of the Parliament of the United Kingdom disestablished in 1983
Westhoughton